The Four-man bobsleigh competition at the 1988 Winter Olympics in Calgary was held on 27 and 28 February, at Canada Olympic Park.

Results

References

Bobsleigh at the 1988 Winter Olympics